Alexander Wellford (April 15, 1911 – September 29, 1993) was an American tennis player who played in the 1953 Wimbledon singles championships. He was, at age 42, perhaps the oldest player in the draw. He lost at Wimbledon in four sets to Ivor Warwick, who two rounds later, played a competitive match against Ken Rosewall.

That year, he also played in the French Championships, losing a close match to Paul Jalabert, who won a set off Lewis Hoad in the next round.  Wellford had won the Tennessee state men's singles title in 1953 before playing in Europe.  In the spring at St. Augustine, Florida, he played a good match against Vic Seixas, who won Wimbledon in June 1953. In the first set against Seixas, Wellford took the ball on the rise and passed Seixas at the net a number of times, getting a 5–2 lead before eventually losing the match.  This was a time of amateur tennis, and it was not unusual for a player who was not always the best in his own city or state to play a competitive match against one of the world's top players.

In 1953, Wellford took on the job of Chairman of the Board for a group seeking to establish a private boys' school in Memphis, Tennessee.  He was Chairman of the Board for Memphis University School until 1978.

In 1952, he was one of the founding members of the Memphis Tennis Association, serving as its first president.  He was inducted into the Tennessee and Southern Tennis Halls of Fame.

1911 births
1993 deaths
American male tennis players
Tennis people from Tennessee
Sportspeople from Memphis, Tennessee